The Société des amis du Louvre ("Society of Friends of the Louvre") is a voluntary association created in 1897 whose objective is to buy objects with an artistic, archeological, or historical value for the Louvre museum.

History

The Society was created in 1897 by a group of luminaries and philanthropists that included Roland Bonaparte, Isaac de Camondo, Henry Greffulhe, and Edmond James de Rothschild. Victor Martin Le Roy, the noted art collector, was also one of the founders and directors of the society.

Activity

The Society has approximately 70000 members. Donations and membership fees allow it to use each year 3 Million euros to acquire art objects.

Its donations to the Louvre museum amount to more than 700 items, from which some masterpieces such as the Pietà of Villeneuve-lès-Avignon, the Turkish Bath by Jean-Auguste-Dominique Ingres, and the diadem of Empress Eugénie. Some of the donations are now in the Guimet Museum or the Musée d'Orsay following reallocation of some of the French state's art collections since World War II.

Presidents
 Georges Berger (1897-1910)
 Jules Maciet (1910-1911)
  (1911-1931)
 Albert Henraux (1932-1953)
 Jacques Dupont (1954-1986)
 Raoul Ergmann (1986-1910)
 François Puaux (1990-1996)
 Marc Fumaroli (1996-2016)
 Louis-Antoine Prat (since 2016)

See also
 Friends of the Natural History Museum Paris
 Art Fund

References

External links
 Official web site

Louvre